The Simla Formation is a stratigraphic unit of Late Devonian (late Frasnian) age. It is present on the western edge of the Western Canada Sedimentary Basin in the Rocky Mountains and foothills of west-central Alberta and east-central British Columbia. It consists primarily of carbonate rocks and siltstone, and was named for Mount Simla in northern Jasper National Park by D. J. McLaren and E. W. Mountjoy in 1962.

The Simla Formation is fossiliferous. It preserves remains of marine animals, and is especially known for its many species of rugose corals.

Lithology and deposition
The Simla Formation consists of recessive argillaceous siltstones, overlain by thick-bedded, cliff-forming limestones and dolomitic limestones. It was deposited as a shallow subtidal, open-marine carbonate shelf.

Thickness and distribution
The Simla Formation is present over a distance of about 280 km (175 mi) in the Rocky Mountains and foothills of west-central Alberta and east-central British Columbia, where it is consistently about 60 to 85 m (200 to 280 feet) thick.

Relationship to other units
Originally considered to be the lower part of the Alexo Formation or a member of the Southesk Formation, the Simla was raised to the rank of formation by H. H. J. Geldsetzer in 1982. It conformably overlies the Mount Hawk Formation or the Southesk Formation, and is conformably overlain by the Sassenach Formation or the Palliser Formation, depending on the location.

Paleontology
The Simla Formation is known for its rugose coral fauna, which comprises more than 30 species. It was the product of an evolutionary burst that began in middle Frasnian time and was ended by the Frasnian–Famennian extinction event. The formation also includes tabulate corals, brachiopods, stromatoporoids, crinoids, conodonts, and foraminifera.

See also

 List of fossiliferous stratigraphic units in Alberta

References

 

Devonian Alberta
Geologic formations of Alberta
Western Canadian Sedimentary Basin
Devonian southern paleotropical deposits
Frasnian Stage
Dolomite formations
Limestone formations
Fossiliferous stratigraphic units of North America
Paleontology in Alberta